Olney (rarely  , rarely ) is a market town and civil parish in the unitary authority area of the City of Milton Keynes, Buckinghamshire, England. At the 2011 Census, it had a population of 6,477. 

History 
During Roman Britain, an area NE of the current town was occupied by a Roman settlement. In 2023, archaeologists uncovered a villa mosaic which were declared "remains of high significance". 

Olney is mentioned as Ollanege (Olla's island) in 932, the town has a history as a lace-making centre. According to the Domesday Book the place, later called Olnei, was held in 1086 AD by Geoffrey de Montbray, Bishop of Coutances, as its overlord.

During the English Civil War, Olney was the site of the Battle of Olney Bridge.

In the late 18th century, William Cowper and John Newton collaborated here on what became known as the Olney Hymns. The town has the Cowper and Newton Museum dedicated to them. The museum was adapted from Cowper's former residence, which was given to the town in 1905 by the publisher William Hill Collingridge (who had been born in the house). Newton was succeeded as curate in Olney by the biblical commentator Thomas Scott (1747–1821).

The hamlet of Olney Park Farm to the north of the town of Olney derives its name from a park established in 1374 by Ralph, Third Baron Bassett of Sapcote in Leicester. In 1861 it attained civil parish status, but was subsequently incorporated into an enlarged Olney civil parish around 1931.

The 1841 census gave the population as 2,362.

Olney Pancake Race 

Since 1445, a pancake race has been run in the town on many Pancake Days, the day before the beginning of Lent. Tradition records that in 1445 on Shrove Tuesday, the "Shriving Bell" rang out to signal the start of the Shriving church service. On hearing the bell a local housewife, who had been busy cooking pancakes in anticipation of the beginning of Lent, ran to the church, frying pan still in hand, tossing the pancake to prevent it from burning, and dressed in her kitchen apron and headscarf.

The women of Olney recreate this race every Shrove Tuesday (known in some countries as Mardi Gras or Fat Tuesday) by running from the market place to the Church of St. Peter and St. Paul, a distance of over 400 yards. The traditional prize is a kiss from the verger. In modern times, Olney competes with the town of Liberal, Kansas in the United States for the fastest time in either town to win the "International Pancake Race". There is also a children's race, run by children from the local schools. The children have to run a distance of about 20 yards. This competition has been run every year since 1950.

Listed buildings and structures
The parish has one grade I listed building, the Church of Saints Peter and Paul; four grade II*,  and a further 114 at grade II. The church is 14th century, with later additions. There is a scheduled monument, a Romano-British settlement, on the northern outskirts of the town.

Description 

The A509 road runs into the wide High Street bordered by historic town houses. The Market Place is the site of a general market on Thursdays and a farmers' market on the first Sunday each month. The vast majority of Olney shops are independents, attracting shoppers from further afield to find the galleries, antique, rug and furniture sellers, as well as boutiques for interior design, fashionable clothes and perfumery. There are restaurants, pubs, cafés and takeaways offering a wide variety of British and international food.

As Olney continues to expand with new housing estates, a secondary-level satellite campus, Ousedale School, has opened for pupils from year 7 to year 11. Olney Infants School is for reception to year 2 children and Olney Middle School takes the children up to year 6, at the age of 11.

Olney is the northernmost town in the Milton Keynes UA, Buckinghamshire and the South East of England region, close to the boundary with Northamptonshire (and the East Midlands), and Bedfordshire (and the East of England).

Transport

Rail
Olney formerly had its own railway station on the Stratford-upon-Avon and Midland Junction Railway and the Bedford-Northampton line, but passenger services were withdrawn in 1962.

Road
The town is bisected by the Central Milton Keynes-Kettering A509 road, which runs southbound towards the M1 at Junction 14 (roughly  distant), and northbound towards the A428 (which runs westbound towards Northampton and eastbound towards Bedford, and Cambridge further afield).

Bus
Bus 21 (Red Rose) connects the town with Lavendon to the north-east, and Newport Pagnell and Central Milton Keynes to the south running approximately every hour from Monday to Friday. Bus 41 (Stagecoach) connects the town with Lavendon, Bedford and Northampton, formerly running approximately every 30 minutes from Monday to Friday. In October 2022, service 41 was reduced to one service to and from Olney per day.

Governance
Olney has been part of the Borough (now City) of Milton Keynes since 1974, which has been a unitary authority since 1997. This gives Milton Keynes City Council the responsibility for the provision of most local government services. Voters registered in the town are represented on MK City Council, which has (since 2014) been divided into 19 wards each carrying 3 councillors with Olney being part of the larger ward of the same name. 

At the parish level, Olney has a town council based at the Olney Centre on the town's high street.

Sport

Rugby football 
Olney has for many years been a rugby town, with its rugby team dating to 1877. Called Olney Rugby Football Club, it has four regular senior teams. They also cater for Colts rugby, women's rugby, girls' rugby and mini rugby. The club holds many social events for the town, one of these being a Rugby 7s tournament, with teams attending from all over the country. Olney's rugby is played to a high standard in the English rugby union Leagues, winning the Lewis Shield in 2007, the Southern Counties North League in 2008, and the Bucks Cup in 2010.

Association football 
The town's football club, Olney Town, played in the United Counties League but closed down in 2018.

The town also has a junior football club, Olney Town Colts FC. The FA Charter Standard club has 27 teams ranging from U5s to U18s and an adult development team ensuring local players can continue playing beyond youth football.

Others 
Other sports activities are supported by clubs for cricket, tennis and bowls, and a hockey club for juniors.

Notable residents 

 Thomas Armstrong, organist and college administrator
 Moses Browne, poet and clergyman
 William Cowper, poet and hymn writer
 Clem Curtis, musician, television personality, a member of The Foundations.
 Henry Gauntlett, organist and composer
 Susannah Martin, a woman executed for witchcraft during the Salem witch trials
 John Newton, clergyman, slave trader turned abolitionist and writer of "Amazing Grace".
 Dan Wheldon (1978–2011) (former resident), racing driver, winner of the 2005 IndyCar Series and twice winner of the Indianapolis 500.

References

External links 

 'Parishes : Olney with Warrington', Victoria History of the Counties of England, A History of the County of Buckingham: Volume 4 (1927), pp. 429–439.
 

 
Towns in Buckinghamshire
Populated places on the River Great Ouse
Market towns in Buckinghamshire
Milton Keynes 
Civil parishes in Buckinghamshire